Wilhelm Bloedorn (born 6 April 1887 in Kukułowo, Kreis Cammin; died 24 March 1946 in Speziallager Fünfeichen bei Neubrandenburg) was a member of the Reichstag for the Nazi Party (NSDAP). He joined the NSDAP around 1928.

References

Nazi Party politicians
Members of the Reichstag of Nazi Germany
Recipients of the Knights Cross of the War Merit Cross
1887 births
1946 deaths
German Army personnel of World War I